Sir Gary Robert Hickinbottom  (born 22 December 1955), is a retired British judge.  In 2008, he became the fourth solicitor to be appointed a High Court judge, after Michael Sachs in 1993, Lawrence Collins in 2000, and Henry Hodge in 2004.

Legal career
He was admitted as a solicitor in 1981, and later became a partner at McKenna & Co (now part of CMS Cameron McKenna).  He became a recorder in 1994 and then a circuit judge in 2001.  He became Chief Social Security Commissioner and Child Support Commissioner in 2003, and Chief Pension Appeal Commissioner. He has also sat as a deputy High Court judge.

Judicial career
Hickinbottom's appointment as a High Court judge was announced in September 2008, with his assignment to the King's Bench Division. He was knighted by the Queen at Buckingham Palace on 20 February 2009. In 2017 he was appointed a Lord Justice of Appeal and therefore, as is customary, was also made a member of the Privy Council, entitling him to the honorific "The Right Honourable".

Notable cases
On 16 July 2007, sitting as a deputy High Court Judge, he upheld an application for judicial review against the decision to slaughter Shambo, a sacred black Friesian bull at the Hindu Skanda Vale Temple near Llanpumsaint in Wales which tested positive for bovine tuberculosis, holding that the Welsh government had failed to carry out the balancing exercise required by Article 9 of the European Convention for the Protection of Human Rights and Fundamental Freedoms (freedom of religion). His ruling was overturned by the Court of Appeal one week later, and the bull was slaughtered within days.

In July 2018, sitting as a Lord Justice in the Divisional Court, he upheld the conviction of Mike Buchanan, leader of the political party Justice for Men and Boys for obstructing the highway. Buchanan was arrested in June 2016 during a protest against male circumcision and convicted in October 2016. Rejecting Buchanan's appeal he said, "Buchanan had been perfectly legitimately protesting on the pavement. But he had then walked alone into the road and stood in front of cars as they tried to pass at the end of the working day. Standing there clearly put him at risk of serious injury - and he understood that risk, and was determined to take it - but it also put others at risk of injury or risked damage to property." The court also added a further £2,424 to his court bill of £3,603, bringing the total bill to £6,027.

In May 2022, he led an inquiry into the corruption of Andrew Fahie in the British Virgin Islands.

Further reading

References

External links 
 Gary Hickinbottom, Judicial Appointments Commission

1955 births
Living people
Alumni of University College, Oxford
English solicitors
21st-century English judges
Knights Bachelor
Members of the Privy Council of the United Kingdom
Queen's Bench Division judges
Lords Justices of Appeal
20th-century English judges